Puzzle Scape is a 2007 puzzle game developed by Finnish developer Farmind and published by Got Game Entertainment.

Gameplay
The game starts with a series of blocks dropping in a playing field and the player's objective is to group blocks within the same color. Once a group of blocks of the same color is arranged in a 2x2 formation, any same-colored adjacent blocks touching the 2x2 group will be deleted from the playing field and awarded points.

Development and release
Puzzle Scape was developed by Finnish developer, Farmind. Samuli Poyhtari served as producer and Juhana Virtanen as lead designer. The game was announced on November 8, 2006, and was to be published by O~3 Entertainment. The publishing reins were taken over by Got Games Entertainment in March 2007 and announced a physical version scheduled to be released in May 2007. The game was re-released on October 1, 2009 as a PlayStation Minis launch title.

Reception

The game had mixed reviews from critics with a common comparison to Lumines.

References

2007 video games
Falling block puzzle games
Multiplayer and single-player video games
PlayStation Network games
PlayStation 3 games
PlayStation Portable games
PlayStation Vita games
Video games developed in Sweden
Got Game Entertainment games